John Lee (born June 28, 1952, in Boston, Massachusetts, United States) is an American bassist, Grammy winning record producer and audio engineer.
 
As a bassist, Lee's career, starting in 1970, includes work with Dizzy Gillespie, Max Roach, Sonny Rollins, McCoy Tyner, James Moody, Jimmy Heath, Joe Henderson, Larry Coryell, Paquito D'Rivera, Gregory Hines, Aretha Franklin, Claudio Roditi, Joachim Kühn and Philip Catherine.

As a producer Lee has produced over 60 albums and CDs, and as a recording engineer he has recorded and mixed over 100 albums and CDs.

Life and career

John Gregory Lee is the son of an African Methodist Episcopal (A.M.E.)  minister, Rev. John W. Lee, and Harriet Holland Lee, who was a career social worker. He grew up in Greenwich, Connecticut, Amityville, New York, and Philadelphia, Pennsylvania.  John began String Bass lessons in 1962 with Carolyn Lush. At Philadelphia's Overbrook High School, John met drummer Gerry Brown, with whom he also studied with at the Philadelphia Musical Academy (which is now the University of the Arts) from 1970 to 1972. In 1971 Lee also began performing with Carlos Garnett and Joe Henderson, and toured with Max Roach thru the spring of 1972 while still a student in Philadelphia. In August 1972 he and Brown relocated to Europe, with Den Haag, Holland as their base. Together they toured Europe and recorded in bands led by  Chris Hinze, Charlie Mariano, Philip Catherine, Joachim Kühn, and Jasper Van't Hof. Lee moved to New York City in October 1974 and worked with Joe Henderson, Lonnie Liston Smith, and Norman Connors until joining The Eleventh House with Larry Coryell in December 1974. In 1975 John Lee and Gerry Brown signed a recording contract with Blue Note Records and formed a working band of their own. In 1977 they moved over to Columbia Records. Lee also began producing records in 1977. From 1982 to 1984, Lee worked with McCoy Tyner. In July 1984 Lee became Dizzy Gillespie’s bassist, touring and recording with Dizzy's Quintet, his Big Band, his Grammy winning “United Nation Orchestra”, and the “Back to the Future Band” that Dizzy co-lead with Miriam Makeba until January 1993 when Makeba died.

Lee has performed at concert halls and jazz clubs in over 100 countries around the world.
He has also toured in the bands of Sonny Rollins, James Moody, Aretha Franklin, Jimmy Heath, Pharoah Sanders, Jackie McLean, Gary Bartz, Gregory Hines,  Hank Jones, Walter Davis Jr., Wolfgang Lackerschmid, Alphonse Mouzon, Claudio Roditi, Jon Faddis, Slide Hampton, Roy Hargrove, and Roberta Gambarini. Lee was also a founding member of “The Fantasy Band”’(1993-1996) with Chuck Loeb, Marion Meadows, and Dave Samuels.
In 1996, at the bequest of Dizzy's wife Lorraine Gillespie and the Dizzy Gillespie Estate, Lee became the director and bassist of the Dizzy Gillespie Alumni All-Stars as well as the Dizzy Gillespie All-Star Big Band, and the Dizzy Gillespie Afro-Cuban Experience. They have recorded five albums and toured extensively around the world.

In 2009 John Lee co-founded the jazz recording label JLP (Jazz Legacy Productions), with partner Lisa Broderick.

Discography

Albums as a leader
Infinite Jones 1973 (with drummer Gerry Brown) Keytone Records
Bamboo Madness1973 (with drummer Gerry Brown) Limetree Records
Mango Sunrise 1975 (with drummer Gerry Brown) Blue Note
Still Can't Say Enough 1976 (with drummer Gerry Brown) Blue Note
Medusa 1977 (with drummer Gerry Brown) Columbia
Chaser 1978 (with drummer Gerry Brown) Columbia
Brothers 1980 (with drummer Gerry Brown) Mood Records
Brothers Reissue 1980 (with drummer Gerry Brown) CD Hot Wire Records EFA12839-2

Selected albums as a bassist
'With Chris Hinze
Virgin Sacrifice 1972 CBS
Mission Suite 1973 MPS
Sister Slick 1974 CBS
Parcival 1976 Philips 6629 006

With James Moody, Sahib Shihab, Jeremy Steig, Chris Hinze
The Flute Summit 1973 Atlantic ATL 50 027

With Wim Stolwijk
Clair-Obscure 1973 CBS S65234

With Charlie Mariano
Cascade 1974 Limetree

With Toots Thielemans
Philip Catherine and Friends 1974 Limetree

With Philip Catherine
September Man 1975 Atlantic
Guitars 1976 Atlantic
Niram 1976 Warner Brothers BS 2950
Selected Works 1974-1982 2017 Warner Music

With Jasper Van't Hof
Eye-Ball 1974 Keytone
However 1977 MPS 15 513

With Joachim Kuhn
Cinemascope 1974 MPS/BASF
Hip Elegy 1975 MPS/BASF
Spring Fever 1976 Atlantic

With Toto Blanke
Spider's Dance 1975 Vertigo – 6360 623

With Piano Conclave w/Gruntz, Dauner, Van't Hof, Kühn & Solal
Palais Anthology 1975 MPS/BASF 20 227863

With Larry Coryell & The 11th House
Level One 1975 Arista AL 4052
Aspects 1976 Arista AL 4077
January 1975, The Livelove Series Vol.1 2014 RadioBremen/Promising Music 441202 CD
The 11th House 1985 Metronome – 829 252-2
Live At The Jazz Workshop Hi Hat Records HHCD014
Seven Secrets 2016 Savoy Jazz SVY16137With Larry CoryellBarefoot Man: Sanpaku 2016 Purple Pyramid CLO 0460With Luther AllisonNight Life 1976 Gordy G6-974S1With KalyanKalyan 1977 MCA VIM-6126With Art WebbLove Eyes 1977 Atlantic SD18226With Bruce FisherRed Hot 1977 Mercury SRM-1-1168With Tony Silvester & The New IngredientMagic Touch 1976 Mercury SRM-1-1105With Mike MandelSky Music 1978 Vanguard 79409With The Visitors, Earl & Carl GrubbsMotherland 1975 Muse 5094With Eddie HendersonRunnin' To Your Love 1979 Capitol/EMI ST-11984With Blue Note All-StarsLive at the Sunset Grill 1976 Blue NoteWith Alphonse MouzonBack Together Again 1977 Atlantic
Poussez - Leave That Boy Alone 1977 Vanguard VSD 79433
Star Edition 1979 MPS Records  0088.045With CBS All-StarsHavana Jam, vol.1 1977 Columbia
Havana Jam, vol.2 1977 ColumbiaWith Ellen McIlwaineEllen McIlwaine 1978 United Artists UA-LA851With Danny ToanBig Foot 1979 Sandra SMP 2105With Stu GoldbergFancy Glance 1979 in-akustik inak 8614With Bob MalachPeople Music 1980 MPS 0068.258With George AcognyFirst Steps In 1980 WEA/Strings 33.851With Hubert EavesEsoteric Funk 1977 East Wind UCCJ-9071With McCoy TynerDimensions 1984 Elektra/MusicianWith Dizzy GillespieLive at the Jazz Plaza Festival, Havana, Cuba 1985 Yemaya YY9438
Gillespie & Sanduval 1986 Habacan HABCD-2435
Endlessly 1988 Impulse MCAD42153
The Symphony Sessions 1989 Sion 181190
A Night In Tunisia 1989 First Choice FC 4502
Live at Blues Alley 1991 Blues Alley BAMSD 110003With Dizzy Gillespie's Big BandLive at Royal Albert Hall 1988 BBCWith Dizzy Gillespie's United Nation OrchestraLive at the Royal Festival Hall 1989 ENJA - GRAMMY WINNERStrangers in Paradise 1990 Jazz Door 1269With Claudio RoditiSamba Manhattan Style 1995 Reservoir
Double Standards 1997 Reservoir
Simpatico 2010 ResonanceWith Fantasy BandThe Fantasy Band 1993 DMP
Sweet Dreams 1994 DMP CD-508
The Kiss 1997 Shanachie 5028With Bass TalkPlay Da Bass 1997 Hot Wire Records HOT 9032CWith Young MCWhat's The Flavor? 1993 Capitol Records – CDEST 2198With Mike LongoDawn of a New Day 1997 CAP 927With Slide HamptonSlide Plays Jobim 2002 Alleycat 20021
Spirit Of The Horn (World of Trombones)  2003 MCG JazzWith LLL Mental (Wolfgang Lackerschmid, Chuck Loeb, Marilyn Mazur)Mental 1997 HotWire 9029With Dizzy Gillespie Alumni All-StarsDizzy's 85th Birthday Celebration Shanachie 5040
Dizzy's World Shanachie 5060With Dizzy Gillespie All-Star Big BandThings to Come MCG Jazz MCGJ1009
Dizzy's Business MCG Jazz MCGJ1023
I'm Beboppin' Too  2009 Halfnote HN4540With Nancy WilsonA Nancy Wilson Christmas MCG Jazz MCGJ1008With Roy Hargrove and the RH FactorHard Groove 2003 VerveWith Karl LathamDancing Spirits Edition Musikat EDM0032With Wolfgang LackerschmidGently But DeepWith Michael Urbaniak & Wolfgang LackerschmidPolish Wind Minor Music Records GMBH 801121With Stephanie SlesingerAngel Eyes 2004 Enja ENJ-94702With Johannes MössingerNew York Trio Serenade 2003 Waterpipe Records 977 464With Yotam SilbersteinBrasil Jazz Legacy Productions JLP 1101016

Albums as a producer
The New Love Carlos Garnett 1977 Muse 5133
Fire Carlos Garnett 32 Jazz 32043
Red Hot Bruce Fisher 1977 Mercury Records SRM-1-1168
Love Eyes Art Webb 1977 Atlantic Records SD 18226
 Zbigniew Seifert 1977 Capitol Records
Medusa 1978 Columbia Records
Chaser John Lee & Gerry Brown 1979 Columbia Records
Brothers (Eff Albers, Gerry Brown, John Lee, Darryl Thompson) 1980 Hot Wire EFA12839-2
Bigfoot Danny Toan 1979 Sandra SMP 2105
Private Concert Larry Coryell 1993 Acoustic Music Records
Sweet Dreams Fantasy Band 1994 DMP CD-508
The Kiss Fantasy Band 1997 Shanachie 5028
LLL Mental (Wolfgang Lackerschmid, Chuck Loeb, Marilyn Mazur) Mental 1997 HotWire 9029
Endless is Love Jon Lucien 1996 Shanachie 5031
Tongo Hip Pocket 1997 TRC 9702
Lavender Light Lavender Light 1994
Lavender Light Light In The House 1996
Once Upon A Time Shirley Marshall 1996 SAMA SO1-918
Laura Heumer 
Judy Gajary
Dizzy's 85th Birthday Celebration Dizzy Gillespie Alumni All-Stars 1997 Shanachie 5040
Slide Plays Jobim Slide Hampton 2002 Alleycat 20021
Live Saundra Santiago
Soul Searchin Winston Byrd 2004 D.Y.P. Limited
Gordon James After Hours 2004 Caress Music
Dizzy's World Dizzy Gillespie Alumni All-Stars 1999 Shanachie
Things to Come Dizzy Gillespie Alumni All-Star Big Band MCG Jazz
Dizzy's Business Dizzy Gillespie All-Star Big Band MCG Jazz
I'm Beboppin' Too Dizzy Gillespie All-Star Big Band HalfNote HN4540
Relentless Sharel Cassity  Jazz Legacy Productions JLP0901001
Spirit Cyrus Chestnut  Jazz Legacy Productions JLP0901002
Eloquence Steve Davis  Jazz Legacy Productions JLP0901003
Endurance Heath Brothers  Jazz Legacy Productions JLP0901004
Incorrigable One for All  Jazz Legacy Productions JLP1001005
Grace Michael Dease  Jazz Legacy Productions JLP 1001007
Resonance Yotam Silberstein  Jazz Legacy Productions JLP 1001008Warriors The Cookers  Jazz Legacy Productions JLP1001009
Musicá Helio Alves  Jazz Legacy Productions JLP1001010
Journeys Cyrus Chestnut Trio  Jazz Legacy Productions JLP1001011Uplift Monty Alexander  Jazz Legacy Productions JLP1001012
Source Benny Green  Jazz Legacy Productions JLP1001014
Resilience Tim Mayer  Jazz Legacy Productions JLP1101015
Brasil Yotam Silberstein Jazz Legacy Productions JLP1101016
Respect vol.1 Roy Assaf  Jazz Legacy Productions JLP11017
Coexist Winard Harper  Jazz Legacy Productions JLP1201018
Blackside Mark Gross  Jazz Legacy Productions JLP1201019
Uplift 2 Monty Alexander  Jazz Legacy Productions JLP1201020
Togetherness Jimmy Heath Big Band  Jazz Legacy Productions JLP1201022
The Shadow Of Your Smile Roberta Gambarini 2013 Boundee Japan FNCJ-5553
Blessings Antonio Hart Jazz Legacy Productions JLP1501023
Angels Andy Scott Jazz Legacy Productions JLP1501021
Melding Hank Jones & Steve Davis  Jazz Legacy Productions JLP
Helio Alves featuring Airto  Jazz Legacy Productions JLP
Coexisting Spirits Roberta Gambarini & Jimmy Heath Groovin' High Records
Subtle Thrills Randa Ghossoub Luna Records
Seven Secrets Larry Coryell's 11th House 2016 Savoy Jazz SVY16137
Evolve Sharel Cassity Relsha Music 001  
Dedications Roberta Gambarini 2019 55 Records FNCJ-5566
Jazz Batá 2 Chucho Valdez 2019 Mack Avenue (2019 Latin Grammy Winner - Best Latin Jazz Album)
Light Blue Julien Hucq 2019 Early Bird Records
Trombocalist  Ron Wilkins 2020

References

1952 births
Living people
Record producers from Massachusetts
People from Boston
20th-century American bass guitarists
The Eleventh House members